Líbano is a town located 34 km south from the city of General Lamadrid. Its name comes from its founding family, Libano Elorrieta.

Populated places in Buenos Aires Province